Wendy Sadler  is a British science communicator and lecturer at Cardiff University. She is the founding director of Science Made Simple, which focuses on engaging audiences with the physical sciences. Her areas of interest include inspiring the next generation of scientists, engineers and communicators; women in STEM; and making STEM subjects accessible to diverse audiences.

Early life 
Sadler was born in 1972 and grew up in Wombourne, England, where she went to Ounsdale High School. She attended Cardiff University and gained a BSc in Physics and Music in 1994.

Career
Sadler considered a career as an acoustic engineer before becoming a manager at Techniquest. She has since completed an MSc in Science Communication at the Open University. Her dissertation assessed the long-term impact of science demonstration shows. She created the non-verbal theatre show called The Experimentrics, which mixed physical theatre and live science demonstrations to create "a world of wordless mystery and fun". Sadler is a LAMDA accredited public speaker and fellow of the Royal Society of the Arts. She regularly appears on television and radio discussing the importance of STEM education. Sadler is a Lecturer and Schools' Liaison Officer at Cardiff University. She is concerned about the state of science education in Wales.

Public engagement 
Sadler is a physics communicator who has published 19 books for children. She has contributed to ITV Wales, BBC Radio and the Edinburgh Fringe Festival. In 2010 Sadler gave a TEDxCardiff talk titled, "Music and the Machine".

Science Made Simple 
Sadler set up Science Made Simple (SMS) in 2002 with the mission to inspire the next generation of scientists and engineers. At the time, Sadler was the IOP Schools Lecturer. SMS develops and presents interactive performances that travel to schools and festivals across the world, reaching 28 countries to date. They have produced shows, contributed to science television, radio programmes, and children's books, trained scientists and acted as consultants on UK research councils. In 2013, she received national media coverage for their tour of UK primary schools following a sell-out run at the Edinburgh Fringe Festival. SMS has reached more than 750,000 people. SMS is part of a multimillion-pound EU project investigating the use of performance as a tool to engage young people with science and society issues.

Work with the Welsh Government 
Sadler Chaired and co-authored the Task and Finish report on STEM engagement in Wales for the National Science Academy and was involved in the writing of the Talented Women for a Successful Wales report.

Awards and fellowships 
 2017 - MBE in Queen's Birthday Honours
 2017 - Institute of Physics William Thomson, Lord Kelvin Medal and Prize
 2015 - Leading Wales Award for Social Enterprise
 2009 - Royal Academy of Engineering medal for the Public Promotion of Engineering
 2008 - UK RC Woman of Outstanding Achievement Award
 2007 - Descartes Prize for Excellence in Science Communication
 2007 - Institute of Acoustics' Award for Promoting Acoustics to the Public
 2005 - Institute of Physics Young Professional Physicist of the Year Award
 2004 - Women in Science and Engineering Excellence Award
 2004 - Welsh Woman of the Year (Science and Technology)

References 

Living people
British physicists
British women physicists
Members of the Order of the British Empire
People from South Staffordshire District
Science communicators
1972 births